Arctomys Falls is a waterfall on Arctomys Creek in  Mount Robson Provincial Park of British Columbia.  The falls results when Arctomys Creek drops out of Arctomys Valley toward its confluence with the Moose River.  The falls and creek are fed by Arctomys Lake.

Arctomys Cave, Canada's second-deepest cave, is located near the upper sections of the falls.

References 

Waterfalls of British Columbia
Robson Valley
Canadian Rockies
Mount Robson Provincial Park